Kumari Moktan (Nepali: कुमारी मोक्तान) is Nepalese politician and member of Bagmati Provincial Assembly. She was also the  parliamentary party deputy leader of the CPN (Maoist Centre) in the Bagmati Provincial Assembly. She is currently serving as Minister for Social Development of Bagmati Province.

Early and Personal life 
Moktan was born on 1980 (B.S. 2057) in Padma Pokhari neighborhood of Hetauda City of Makwanpur District. She is the eldest child of father Sanu Kancha Moktan and mother Tirtha Maya Moktan. Moktan has three sisters and two brothers. His father died when she was ten years old. 

She is married to Dawa Tamang.

Political career 
Moktan start her political journey as a student in 1994 . She became Makwanpur District party secretary in 2003 (B.S. 2059), district bureau secretary of the party in 2004 (B.S. 2060) and became the central vice-president of Tamang Morcha in 2005 and the head of the party people's government in Makwanpur District. After the peace agreement, she was nominated as a member of legislative in 2007. She was elected as a member of the constituent Assembly from Makwanpur 4 (constituency) in 2008.

Moktan was elected as a member of the Bagmati Provincial Assembly from Makwanpur 2 (A) in 2017 Bagmati Provincial Assembly election and re-elected from the same constituency in 2022 Bagmati Provincial Assembly election. She became the Minister of Social Development 2017  under the leadership of Rajendra Pandey 's cabinet and was re-appointed as the Minister of Social Development in Shalikram Jamkattel 's cabinet.

Election History

2022 Bagmati Provincial Assembly election

2017 Bagmati Provincial Assembly election

References 

Living people
Nepalese activists
21st-century Nepalese politicians
Members of the Provincial Assembly of Bagmati Province